Lyamenskaya is a rural locality (a village) in Gorodishchenskoye Rural Settlement, Nyuksensky District, Vologda Oblast, Russia. The population was 25 as of 2002.

Geography 
Lyamenskaya is located 44 km southeast of Nyuksenitsa (the district's administrative centre) by road. Mikshino is the nearest rural locality.

References 

Rural localities in Nyuksensky District